Nina Hoekman (8 August 1964 – 26 June 2014) was a Ukrainian-Dutch draughts player and coach. At the 2012 World Mind Sports Games she received a silver medal.

Career
Born Nina Georgijevna Jankovskaja in Kiev, Hoekman moved to the Netherlands in 1995, and later married Dutch draughts player Henk Hoekman. She became Dutch draughts champion 11 times, winning her last title in March 2014 when she was in a wheelchair and not able to move the pieces herself because of her illness.

Death
She died of breast cancer in Zutphen, aged 49.

References

1964 births
2014 deaths
Sportspeople from Kyiv
Deaths from cancer in the Netherlands
Deaths from breast cancer
Ukrainian draughts players
Dutch draughts players
Players of international draughts
Ukrainian emigrants to the Netherlands